Lucille Frances Lawless  (born 29 March 1968) is a New Zealand actress and singer. She is best known for her roles as Xena in the television series Xena: Warrior Princess, as D'Anna Biers on the re-imagined Battlestar Galactica series, and Lucretia in the television series Spartacus: Blood and Sand and associated series.  Since 2019, she has starred as Alexa in the television series My Life Is Murder.

Lawless had recurring roles as Diane Lewis-Swanson on the NBC sitcom Parks and Recreation (2012–2015), and as Countess Palatine Ingrid Von Marburg on the WGN America supernatural series Salem (2015). She also starred as Ruby on the Starz horror-comedy series Ash vs Evil Dead (2015–2018).

Early life 
Lucille Frances "Lucy" Ryan was born in the Auckland suburb of Mount Albert to teacher Julie Ryan (nee Haynes) and Mount Albert's mayor, banker Frank Ryan. She is the fifth of six siblings (four brothers and one sister). She has described her family as "this big, sprawling Irish Catholic family", and while filming in Ireland for the Discovery Channel in 2004, told Ireland on Sunday that her father's family originated in Quilty, County Clare.

Her first musical was at age 10 and she began acting in secondary school. She attended Marist College, Auckland, and began studies at Auckland University in languages. At 18, she went on her "overseas experience", travelling through Europe and Australia with her future husband, Garth Lawless. At 21, she won the 1989 Mrs New Zealand competition.

Lawless has said she suffered from bulimia as a child, but was able to overcome the illness.

Career 
Lawless's television debut was 2½ seasons in the cast of a New Zealand sketch-comedy series, Funny Business. Then she studied drama at the William Davis Centre for Actors Study in Vancouver, British Columbia, Canada.

In 1994, Lawless appeared in Hercules and the Amazon Women, that became the television pilot for Hercules: The Legendary Journeys. In that episode, she played a man-hating Amazon named Lysia. She went on to play another character, Lyla, in the first-season episode "As Darkness Falls".

Xena: Warrior Princess 

Lawless received her best-known role as a heroic warrior woman named Xena in the first season of Hercules. She first appeared in the episode "The Warrior Princess" which aired in March 1995. R. J. Stewart dramatised the teleplay from a story that Robert G. "Rob" Tapert commissioned John Schulian to write. The character became a fan favourite. Vanessa Angel was originally cast in the role, but she fell ill and was unable to travel to New Zealand for shooting. To differentiate between Xena and the similar Lysia, Lawless's hair, previously an ash blonde, was dyed black. She also wore a much darker costume. Lawless returned as Xena in two more episodes of the first season of Hercules, which portrayed her turn from villainess to a good, heroic character.

The character was popular enough that a spin-off series was created: Xena: Warrior Princess debuted on 4 September 1995. Xena: Warrior Princess, like its parent programme, was a huge hit and achieved high ratings and cultural significance, lasting six seasons. The series brought Lawless an immense amount of attention and she became an international celebrity.

While taping an appearance on The Tonight Show with Jay Leno in October 1996, Lawless suffered a fractured pelvis when the horse she was riding lost its footing in the studio car park. She made a complete recovery, but several episodes of the second season of Xena were rewritten to focus on background characters to minimise the time Lawless was needed on set.

LGBT rights icon 

Xena's ambiguous romantic relationship with travelling companion Gabrielle (Renee O'Connor) led to Lawless becoming a lesbian icon, a role of which she has said she is proud. She has said that during the years she was playing the role, she had been undecided on the nature of the relationship, but in a 2003 interview with Lesbian News magazine, she said that after viewing the series finale, she had come to see Xena and Gabrielle's relationship as definitely gay, adding "they're married, man". This reputation became cemented after her "graphic lesbian sex scenes" in Spartacus: Gods of the Arena. She has appeared at gay pride events such as the Sydney Gay and Lesbian Mardi Gras.

For her support of LGBT rights, including her public support for same-sex marriage, in 2017 Lawless was given the Star 100–Ally of the Year award at the Australian LGBTI Awards ceremony.

Other work 
Lawless first appeared on Broadway in September 1997 in the Grease revival, as the "bad girl" character Betty Rizzo. She wanted to play the lead role of Sandy and later stated her belief that the producers typecast her to play "bad girls" following her success as Xena. She said the Sandy character was very similar to her sheltered childhood, growing up in New Zealand with many protective older brothers.

From 2005 to 2009, she had a recurring role in the television series Battlestar Galactica. Lawless appeared as D'Anna Biers, a reporter with the Fleet News Service who worked on a critical documentary about the crew of the Galactica and was later revealed to be Humanoid Cylon model Number Three.

Lawless competed as one of the celebrity singers on the Fox reality TV show Celebrity Duets in 2006, finishing as the runner-up to winner Alfonso Ribeiro.

Lawless has also performed as a voice actor in several animated features: In 2008, Lawless voiced the animated character of Diana Prince/Wonder Woman in the direct-to-video superhero animated film, Justice League: The New Frontier, adapted from the DC Comics limited series. In 2014, Lawless voiced the militaristic "Queen of the Ants" in the American animated television series Adventure Time on the Cartoon Network.

In 2007, Lawless was to appear as one of the leads in the ensemble cast of the ABC television series, Football Wives, based on the popular British series Footballers' Wives. The series did not continue past the pilot episode, but the network extended the options on its contracts with Lawless and the other actors slated to star in the series, including Gabrielle Union, Kiele Sanchez, Ving Rhames, and James Van Der Beek.

Lawless returned to television on 10 November 2008 in a guest-starring role on the CBS television series CSI: Miami, in a Season 7 episode, "Cheating Death", playing a madam with connections to a murder and helping Horatio "H" Caine with his inquiries.

In 2009, Lawless appeared in two episodes of the final season of The L Word as Sergeant Marybeth Duffy. She played a role in the Adam Sandler movie Bedtime Stories released December 2008. Also in 2008, Lawless appeared with her former Xena stuntwoman Zoë Bell in Sony (Crackle)'s new web series Angel of Death, written by Ed Brubaker, which debuted online in early 2009. In 2009, Lawless guest-starred in the HBO series Flight of the Conchords as Paula, assistant to the Prime Minister of New Zealand.

Lawless co-starred in the Starz original series Spartacus: Blood and Sand. The show was based on the life of Spartacus, the famous gladiator, and the slave revolt he led, and was produced by long-time Xena producers Sam Raimi and "Rob" Tapert, her own husband. Lawless played the role of Lucretia, the wife of Lentulus Batiatus, who were both the owners of a gladiator ludus, which also saw Lawless doing nude scenes for the first time. Lawless won the 2011 Saturn Award as Best Supporting Actress for her role as Lucretia in Spartacus: Blood and Sand. Lawless reprised her role as Lucretia in Spartacus: Gods of the Arena, which chronicled life in the Ludus before Spartacus's arrival, and she also returned for the sequel Spartacus: Vengeance.

Lawless provided the voice of Goldmoon for Dragonlance: Dragons of Autumn Twilight, a direct-to-DVD animated movie based on the novel of the same name. From 2012 to 2015, she had a recurring role on the NBC series Parks and Recreation as Diane, the love interest and eventual wife of Ron Swanson.

In 2014, Lawless guest starred in Agents of Shield as Isabelle Hartley in the season two premiere, and reprised the role later in episode 15 of season two, 'One Door Closes.' In 2015, Lawless landed the recurring guest role of Countess Palatine Ingrid Von Marburg in WGN America's Salem. Countess Marburg is presented as one of the last remaining survivors of the legendary line of ancient German witches. The series ended in 2017. In March 2015, it was announced that she would be portraying the role of Ruby in Starz horror-comedy series Ash vs Evil Dead. The series ended in 2018.

Lawless is currently playing Alexa Crowe, a private investigator in My Life Is Murder. The Acorn TV series began in 2019 and reached its third season in 2022.

Singing career 

Lawless, who has a background in musical theatre, played Betty Rizzo on Broadway in a production of Grease in 1997. She continued to sing during the run of Xena, even contributing dirge music of her own composition; this made it into the episode "The Path Not Taken" as the dirge "Burial", which she sang for the first time in the episode. Two musically-oriented episodes, "The Bitter Suite" and "Lyre, Lyre, Heart's on Fire", also showcased not only her singing but also that of some of her castmates. (See also List of Xena: Warrior Princess episodes for details.)

Lawless was encouraged to resume her singing career after being a contestant on Celebrity Duets, which she finished as runner-up to Alfonso Ribeiro. She made her solo debut at the Roxy in Hollywood, a venue of 500 seats, on 13 January 2007, with a sold-out crowd for consecutive concerts.

Charity 
Lawless is a member of the board of trustees of the StarShip Foundation, the charity arm of the Starship Children's Health which is part of the Auckland District Health Board. It is set up to provide additional equipment, support and help to staff, patients and families. She helps fundraising for the organisation. She recently sat for the New Zealand television series The Sitting, an arts series where celebrity portraits are produced during an interview session, with the portraits later auctioned for charity.

Since 2006, 21 September marks "Lucy Lawless Feel the Love Day/Week". The day, organised by the Official Lucy Lawless Fan Club, begins a week of charitable acts and donations by fans in honour and support of Lawless.

Activism 
In May 2009 Lawless became a "climate ambassador" for the Greenpeace "Sign On" campaign.

In February 2012, she and six other Greenpeace activists boarded an oil drilling ship at Port Taranaki, and remained on it for 77 hours to stop it leaving for the Arctic where it was going to take part in oil exploration. She was subsequently arrested and charged with burglary, which carried an imprisonment term of up to 10 years if convicted. She pleaded guilty on 14 June 2012 to trespass charges regarding the February incident. Lawless said she intended for now to remain involved with Greenpeace. In February 2013, Lawless and the other six activists were each sentenced to pay a fine of NZ$651 and undertake 120 hours of community service. The judge denied the NZ$545,000 in reparations that Shell Todd Oil Services had sought from the activists. Following the sentencing, Lawless said: "I consider it a great victory that the court has struck down the reparation demand from Shell, which I think was absolutely ludicrous."

Astronomy 
Astronomer Michael E. Brown nicknamed his newly discovered dwarf planet "Xena"; its then-official designation being 2003 UB313. When this object was initially determined to be larger than Pluto, it gained international attention and forced a year-long debate among astronomers as to the definition of a planet. (Observations made by New Horizons subsequently found Pluto to be marginally larger than the object, which was ultimately named Eris.)

The object's nickname "Xena" was used in the press. New Scientist magazine polled the public on their preferred final name for the so-called tenth planet; "Xena" ranked number 4. Lawless rang Mike Brown in December 2005 to thank him for his "senseless act of beauty", and claimed that she "never dared hope [the name] would stick." Eventually, both it and Pluto were deemed not to be true planets, and were instead classified as dwarf planets.

Although "Xena" is now officially known as Eris, Brown made an indirect tribute to Lawless by naming Eris's moon Dysnomia after the Greek goddess of lawlessness.

Personal life 
In 1988, she became pregnant from her boyfriend Garth Lawless while working with him in the Australian outback. They married in Kalgoorlie, Western Australia, that year, then returned to New Zealand where their daughter, Daisy, was born. They divorced in 1995.

On 28 March 1998, Lawless married Xena's executive producer, Pacific Renaissance Pictures CEO Robert Tapert. They have two sons.

Filmography

Film

Television

Video games 

 Hunted: The Demon's Forge (2011), as Seraphine

Stage 
1997: Grease! – On Broadway, NY USA
2002: The Vagina Monologues – Auckland, NZ
2005: Gentlemen Prefer Blondes – Seattle, USA
2011: BARE For Christchurch – Auckland, NZ
2013: Chicago The Musical – Hollywood Bowl, LA, USA
2013: Chicago The Musical – Auckland, NZ
2014–2015: Sleeping Beauty and Her Winter Knight – Pasadena, CA, USA
2017: Pleasuredome The Musical – Auckland, NZ

Discography 
 Albums
Come 2 Me
Come To Mama: Lucy Lawless in Concert: The Roxy Theater in Hollywood

Concert DVDs
Come To Mama: Lucy Lawless in Concert: The Roxy Theater in Hollywood
Gimme Some, Sugar: Lawless, NYC
Lucy Lawless Live in Chicago: Still Got The Blues
Lucy Lawless Live at The Roxy Theater: Ho Down
Lucy Lawless Live in Concert: Welcome to the Pleasuredome

Other songs
"Little Child" on Unexpected Dreams – Songs From the Stars
"4 All of Us" with Pauly Fuemana (OMC)
"Little Child" on The Starship Christmas Album 2012 – Starship Foundation

Honours 
In the 2004 Queen's Birthday Honours, Lawless was appointed a Member of the New Zealand Order of Merit, for services to entertainment and the community.

Awards and nominations

References

External links 

1968 births
20th-century New Zealand actresses
21st-century New Zealand actresses
New Zealand LGBT rights activists
Living people
Members of the New Zealand Order of Merit
New Zealand expatriates in Australia
New Zealand expatriate actresses in the United States
20th-century New Zealand women singers
New Zealand film actresses
New Zealand people of Irish descent
New Zealand stage actresses
New Zealand television actresses
New Zealand video game actresses
New Zealand voice actresses
People educated at Marist College, Auckland
People from Auckland
21st-century New Zealand women singers